The mineral petzite, Ag3AuTe2, is a soft, steel-gray telluride mineral generally deposited by hydrothermal activity. It forms isometric crystals, and is usually associated with rare tellurium and gold minerals, often with silver, mercury, and copper.

The name comes from chemist W. Petz, who first analyzed the mineral from the type locality in Săcărâmb, Transylvania, Romania in 1845. It was described by Wilhelm Karl Ritter von Haidinger in 1845 and dedicated to W. Petz who had carried out the first analyses.

It occurs with other tellurides in vein gold deposits. It is commonly associated with native gold, hessite, sylvanite, krennerite, calaverite, altaite, montbrayite, melonite,
frohbergite, tetradymite, rickardite, vulcanite and pyrite.

Petzite forms together with uytenbogaardtite (Ag3AuS2) and fischesserite (Ag3AuSe2) the uytenbogaardtite group.

See also
List of minerals
List of minerals named after people

References

Silver minerals
Gold minerals
Gold(I) compounds
Telluride minerals
Cubic minerals
Minerals in space group 214
Minerals described in 1845